This is a list of women writers born in the Netherlands, or whose writings are closely associated with it.

A
Jo van Ammers-Küller (1884–1966), interwar novelist and non-fiction writer
Threes Anna (born 1959), novelist, live performance producer and film director

B
Maria Barnas (born 1973), novelist, poet and essayist
Marjolein Bastin (born 1943), children's writer and illustrator
Beatrice of Nazareth (1200–1268), prioress and author of early Dutch prose work Van seven manieren van heiliger minnen (Seven Ways of Holy Love)
Thea Beckman (1923–2004), children's writer
Nel Benschop (1918–2005), poet
Carli Biessels (1936–2016), children's writer
Anna Blaman (1905–1960), poet and novelist
Marion Bloem (born 1952), Indo (Dutch/East Indian) novelist, non-fiction writer and documentary film producer
Louise Sophie Blussé (1801–1896), non-fiction writer
Anna Louisa Geertruida Bosboom-Toussaint (1812–1886), novelist
Anneke Brassinga (born 1948), poet, prose writer and translator
Til Brugman (1888–1958), poet, novelist and translator
Andreas Burnier (1931–2002), poet, novelist and active feminist

C
Isabelle de Charrière (1740–1805), correspondent, novelist and playwright writing in French
Willy Corsari (1897–1998), novelist, actress, comédienne and composer

D
Aagje Deken (1741–1804), poet and correspondent
Maria Dermoût (1888–1962), novelist; author of The Ten Thousand Things
Thea Doelwijt (born 1938), journalist, novelist and playwright
Renate Dorrestein (1954–2018), journalist and novelist
Tonke Dragt (born 1930), children's writer and illustrator; author of De brief voor de Koning (Letter for the King)
Jessica Durlacher (born 1961), critic, columnist and novelist

E
Anna Enquist (born 1945), poet and novelist
Henrica van Erp (c. 1480 – 1548), abbess and author of her monastery's Chronicle

F
Anne Frank (1929–1945), author of The Diary of a Young Girl and Holocaust victim

G
Ida Gerhardt (1905–1997), poet
Hermine de Graaf (1951–2013), fiction writer
Els de Groen (born 1949), politician, novelist and non-fiction writer

H
Francisca de Haan (fl. 1998 onwards), historian of gender studies
Hella Haasse (1918–2011), novelist with some works set in the East Indies
Judith Herzberg (born 1934), poet and playwright 
Nienke van Hichtum (1860–1939), children's writer in West Frisian and Dutch
Etty Hillesum (1914–1943), diarist and correspondent during the German occupation of Amsterdam 
Rozalie Hirs (born 1965), poet and composer
Marjolijn Hof (born 1956), novelist with some works translated into English
Xaviera Hollander (born 1943), call girl and memoirist
Maria Aletta Hulshoff (1781–1846), feminist writer
Cornélie Huygens (1848–1902), feminist activist and columnist

I
Marith Iedema (born 1989), journalist and documentarian

K
Marie Kessels (born 1954), poet and prose writer
Yvonne Keuls (born 1931), Indo writer and novelist
Yvonne Kroonenberg (born 1950), psychologist, columnist and author of works about men
Mina Kruseman (1839–1922), feminist and non-fiction writer
Gerdina Hendrika Kurtz (1899–1989), historical writer
Emy Koopman (born 1985), video and print journalist, bibliotherapy researcher and scholar

L
Astrid Lampe (born 1955), poet and actress
Katharyne Lescailje (1649–1711), poet and translator
Noni Lichtveld (1929–2017), children's writer and illustrator based in Suriname
Johanna Dorothea Lindenaer (1664–1737), memoirist and translator
Tessa de Loo (born 1946), novelist
Emilie Luzac (1748–1788), correspondent

M
Cissy van Marxveldt (1889–1948), children's writer
Dora van der Meiden-Coolsma (1918–2001), columnist and children's writer
Clara Meijers (1885–1964), feminist writer
Vonne van der Meer (born 1952), fiction writer and playwright
Doeschka Meijsing (1947–2012), novelist
Hanny Michaelis (1922–2007), poet
Marga Minco (born 1920), journalist and novelist
Marente de Moor (born 1972), novelist and columnist
Mieke Mosmuller (born 1951), fiction and non-fiction writer in Dutch and German
Charlotte Mutsaers (born 1942) prose writer and essayist

N
Saskia Noort (born 1967), crime-fiction writer and journalist

P
Connie Palmen (born 1955), novelist
Marianne Philips (1886–1951), psychological novelist and politician
Ethel Portnoy (1927–2004), essayist, columnist and fiction writer in English
Maria Pypelinckx (1538–1608), correspondent

Q
Catharina Questiers (1631–1669), poet and playwright

R
Veronique Renard (born 1965), trans woman memoirist and non-fiction writer in English
Henriette Roland Holst (1869–1952), poet, playwright and biographer
Astrid Roemer (born 1947), Suriname novelist and poet living in the Netherlands
Hannie Rouweler (born 1951), Dutch poet
Heleen van Royen (born 1965), novelist and columnist
Renate Rubinstein (1929–1990), journalist, columnist and non-fiction writer
Helga Ruebsamen (1934–2016), columnist and novelist
Anna Rutgers van der Loeff (1910–1990), children's writer

S
Heleen Sancisi-Weerdenburg (1944–2000), historical works on Ancient Greece and Persia
Annet Schaap (born 1965), children's literature
Margo Scharten-Antink (1868–1957), poet and novelist
Mineke Schipper (born 1938), novelist and non-fiction writer on women's literature
Annie M. G. Schmidt (1911–1995), children's writer and television screenwriter
Anna Maria van Schurman (1607–1678), German-born poet with works in Latin in defence of female education
Anja Sicking (born 1965), fiction writer
Hilda van Stockum (1908–2006), English-language children's writer

T
Marianne Thieme (born 1972), politician and writer on animals rights
Petronella Johanna de Timmerman (1723–1786), poet and translator

U
Mellie Uyldert (1908–2009), astrologer and esoteric writer

V
M. Vasalis (1909–1998), poet and psychiatrist
Cornelia van der Veer (1639–1704), poet
Jacoba van Velde (1903–1985), novelist author of De grote zaal
Stephanie Vetter (1884–1974), fiction writer
Anna Visscher (1584–1651), poet and translator 
Simone van der Vlugt (born 1966), historical and young-adult novelist
Ida Vos (1931–2006), children's writer
Beb Vuyk (1905–1991), Indo fiction writer

W
Lulu Wang (born 1960), Chinese-born novelist writing in Dutch
Elly de Waard (born 1940), poet and music critic
Maria Petronella Woesthoven (1760–1830), poet
Betje Wolff (1738–1804), epistolary novelist of works co-authored with Aagje Deken

Z
Marie van Zeggelen (1870–1957), novelist and children's writer
Annejet van der Zijl (born 1962), novelist and biographer

See also
List of women writers
List of Dutch writers

References

-
Dutch women writers, List of
Writers
Women writers, List of Dutch